Extr-A-Teens is an extended play by Swedish pop group A-Teens. It was released in 2000 exclusively in Chile after the success of their first album, The ABBA Generation. The EP features Spanish language versions of "Mamma Mia" and "Gimme! Gimme! Gimme! (A Man After Midnight)", in addition to a megamix of songs from their first album. The CD is enhanced with the music video for "Gimme! Gimme! Gimme! (A Man After Midnight)".

Track listing

A-Teens albums
2000 EPs
Universal Music Group EPs